Kenneth Albert Gilbert  (December 16, 1931 – April 15, 2020) was a Canadian harpsichordist, organist, musicologist, and music educator.

Biography 
Born in Montreal, Gilbert studied at the Conservatoire de musique du Québec à Montréal under Yvonne Hubert (piano) and Gabriel Cusson (harmony and counterpoint). He also studied the organ with Conrad Letendre in Montréal. In 1953 he won the Prix d'Europe for organ performance, an award which enabled him to pursue studies in Paris, France with Nadia Boulanger (composition), Maurice Duruflé (organ), Ruggero Gerlin (harpsichord), Gaston Litaize (organ), and Sylvie Spicket (harpsichord) from 1953 to 1955. He later studied the harpsichord privately under Wanda Landowska.

Gilbert made his first recordings with the Canadian label Baroque Records Co. of Canada Ltd. in 1962 – an all-J. S. Bach program, followed by several more solo harpsichord recordings of music by Bach, another of Rameau, and several chamber music albums with other Canadian artists: Mario Duschenes (flute & recorder), Steven Staryk (violin), Jacques Simard (oboe), as well as French flautist Jean-Pierre Rampal. As organist, he recorded an album of works by Boehm, Buxtehude and Walther on two Casavant-built instruments in Quebec. (All of these recordings were subsequently reissued on Orion Master Recordings in the U.S.A.) In 1983 he recorded a two-CD selection from the Montreal Organ Book on the Hellmuth Wolff organ at McGill University for the Canadian label Analekta.

Gilbert performed for the Peabody Mason concert series in 1974. He died on April 15, 2020 at the age of 88.

Students

Pascal Dubreuil
Emmanuelle Haïm
Sébastien d'Hérin
Wolfgang Karius
Oscar Milani
Davitt Moroney
María Luisa Ozaita
Mario Raskin
Ludger Rémy
Scott Ross
Heather Slade-Lipkin
Jos Van Immerseel
Jory Vinikour
Giorgio Cerasoli
John Whitelaw
Ilton Wjuniski
Paola Erdas

Decorations and awards
Officer of the Order of Canada (1986)
Fellow of the Royal Society of Canada (1988)
Honorary doctorate in Music (McGill University, Montreal)
Honorary Member of the Royal Academy of Music (London)
Member of the Royal Society of Canada
Austrian Cross of Honour for Science and Art, 1st class (1999)

References

External links
Kenneth Gilbert at The Canadian Encyclopedia
 
 IMSLP
 Avis de décès

Academics of the Royal Academy of Music
Canadian classical musicians
Canadian harpsichordists
Canadian performers of early music
Conservatoire de musique du Québec à Montréal alumni
Fellows of the Royal Society of Canada
Honorary Members of the Royal Academy of Music
2020 deaths
Academic staff of Mozarteum University Salzburg
Musicians from Montreal
Officers of the Order of Canada
Officiers of the Ordre des Arts et des Lettres
Recipients of the Austrian Cross of Honour for Science and Art, 1st class
1931 births
Academic staff of Université Laval